The Oklahoma House of Representatives is the lower house of the legislature of the U.S. state of Oklahoma. Its members introduce and vote on bills and resolutions, provide legislative oversight for state agencies, and help to craft the state's budget. The upper house of the Oklahoma Legislature is the Oklahoma Senate.

The Oklahoma Constitution established the powers of the Oklahoma House of Representatives in 1907. Voters further amended those powers through constitutional referendums. One referendum required legislators to balance the annual state budget. Others specified the length and dates of the legislative session. Today, there are 101 House members, each representing a legislative district. District boundaries are redrawn every decade to ensure districts of equal population. Members must be 21 years of age at the time of election and a qualified elector and a resident of the legislative district to serve in the House. The state holds district elections every two years coincident with federal elections and special elections to fill vacant seats. The House meets from early February until the last Friday in May. Members elect a Speaker of the Oklahoma House of Representatives as the presiding officer and a Speaker Pro Tempore, who serves as the presiding officer in the absence of the speaker. Members organize in political party-based caucuses to develop partisan policy agendas.

After the 2022 election, Republicans hold a supermajority of the House seats in the 59th Oklahoma Legislature.

History

Early years
The Oklahoma Constitution established both the Oklahoma House of Representatives and Oklahoma Senate in 1907. It met in Guthrie until 1910. William H. Murray was the first Speaker of the Oklahoma House of Representatives. Less than 50 legislative employees aided lawmakers in the first year.

A weakening of the Democratic coalition leading up to the 1908 election allowed Republicans to make gains in the Oklahoma House. Republicans gained an even third of the legislative seats. The largest gains came in Holdenville, Okmulgee, and Guthrie, each of which had a sizable African-American population.
  
The Oklahoma Democratic lawmakers of the early 1900s opposed integration. The first legislature passed legislation that made it almost impossible for African-Americans to vote. The legislature's first African-American member, A. C. Hamlin, served only one term, though he did gain the support of his fellow lawmakers to fund an African-American school in his district and create more equal accommodations for black and white railroad passengers.

The Democratic Party also pushed to make Oklahoma City the capital over Guthrie, a Republican and African-American voting stronghold.

In 1913, a House investigative committee forced the resignation of the state auditor and impeached the state printer and insurance commissioner. The legislature at the time included Democratic members who were angry at then Governor Lee Cruce over his veto of a redistricting plan that would have gerrymandered Congressional districts and his attempt to remove public institutions established by earlier legislatures. Cruce escaped an impeachment trial by one vote of the House investigative committee.

Women earned the right to vote in Oklahoma in 1918 through a constitutional amendment approved by voters. In 1920, Bessie S. McColgin became the first woman elected to the Oklahoma House of Representatives. A Republican, McColgin and her female colleague in the Oklahoma Senate, focused on the passage of public health bills, but failed in many of their efforts.

After eight Democratic-controlled Legislatures, Republicans took the majority from 1921 to 1922 and elected George B. Schwabe as Speaker of the Oklahoma House of Representatives. The Republican-dominated House brought impeachment charges against Lieutenant Governor Martin Trapp and narrowly failed to approve impeachment charges against both the state treasurer and Oklahoma Governor James Roberts. The Democratic-dominated Senate did not sustain the impeachment charges against Trapp.

Members of the Oklahoma House of Representatives voted eleven articles of impeachment against Governor Henry S. Johnston, which led to his expulsion from office.

1930s through 1950s
A severe drought beginning in 1932 in western Oklahoma combined with land consolidation and mechanization in eastern Oklahoma drove farmers out of the state and left others in economic distress. Legislatures of the 1930s battled with governors William H. Murray and Ernest W. Marland, targeting Murray's efforts to generate relief for farmers and Marland's proposals to create a state public works program, reform the tax code and create unemployment insurance. Lawmakers did enact an old age pension system funded by a dedicated sales tax. The rejection of providing state matching funds for New Deal projects resulted in fewer projects. A conservative reaction developed in Oklahoma in the late 1930s and rejected further New Deal programs.

In 1941, Governor Leon C. Phillips pushed the state legislature to send a constitutional amendment to voters to force the Oklahoma House of Representatives to approve a balanced budget each year. Ever since voters approved the state question, the state legislature has been constitutionally required to pass a balanced budget.

The number of Republican Party seats in the Oklahoma House of Representatives plummeted in the 1930s.

1960s to present
The legislative sessions held by the Oklahoma House of Representatives and Oklahoma Senate changed due to two key legislative reforms in 1966 and 1989. In 1966, Oklahomans voted to institute 90-day annual sessions. An initiative petition championed by Governor Henry Bellmon in 1989 further required the legislative sessions to end by 5 p.m. on the last Friday in May.

After earlier attempts to raise legislative pay failed, voters approved a state question in 1968 to create a board to set legislative compensation. It set compensation at $8,400 that year.

State legislators enacted Oklahoma's open meeting and open records laws in 1977, but made the Oklahoma House of Representatives exempt.

A shift in the behavior of Oklahoma voters occurred, beginning in the 1960s. Registered Democrats began to more often vote Republican at the federal level and later at state level. As partisan debate became more polarizing, southern states including Oklahoma abandoned old voting patterns of supporting the Democratic party. After the 2004 Presidential Election, Republicans gained control of the House for the first time since 1921. In 2010, Republicans gained a large majority of 70 seats in the Oklahoma House of Representatives. Following the 2018 general election, Republicans gained the largest majority in state history with 76 of the 101 seats. This also includes the largest ever freshman class, with 46 new representatives.

Powers and legislative process
The Oklahoma House and the Oklahoma Senate are responsible for introducing and voting on bills and resolutions, providing legislative oversight for state agencies, and helping to craft the state's budget. Every ten years, legislators are responsible for designating new district boundaries for state electoral districts, along with Congressional districts. The governor must sign these bills into law, or a statewide panel convenes to draw the disputed lines.

Legislators, with staff support, develop and file bills prior to the legislative session. Bill sponsors submit requests for bill drafting to the professional staff of the Oklahoma House of Representatives. The staff ensure bills have proper legal language and meet constitutional requirements. The bills are filed electronically with the Clerk of the House's office by a designated filing deadline. Since 1999, members of the Oklahoma House are limited to a maximum of eight bills that will receive a hearing.

A proposal may be introduced as a bill, a joint resolution, a concurrent resolution, or a simple resolution. Legislators use joint resolutions to propose a constitutional amendment. Concurrent resolutions (passed by both houses) and simple resolutions (passed by only one house) do not have the force of law. Instead, they serve to express the opinion of approving house of houses, or to regulate procedure. Article 5 Section 33 of the Oklahoma Constitution requires bills for raising revenue to originate in the Oklahoma House.

The Oklahoma House meets in regular session in the west wing of the Oklahoma State Capitol in Oklahoma City, from the first Monday in February to the last Friday in May. Special sessions may be called by the governor, or by a written call signed by two-thirds of the members of each chamber of the Legislature.

Bills receive a First Reading when they are published in the House Journal. They then undergo a Second Reading upon assignment to committee. The committee system is designed to screen out legislation that is, in the committee's judgment, unnecessary or not ready for passage.

Committees either stop the progress of a bill or approve it for consideration on the floor of the House. When a bill is called up on the floor, either the principal author or a designated member will be recognized for the explanation of the bill. Typically, after questions from other members, the bill is advanced to Third Reading and a vote is taken on final passage.

Fifty-one votes are required for bill passage on the floor of the Oklahoma House. Lawmakers also vote on whether or not to make the bill effective upon signature of the governor, which requires a two-thirds majority. Action on the floor is recorded in the House Journal.
 
Once approved on Third Reading, which is the name for this stage of the floor process, approved bills are sent to the Oklahoma Senate. If amended, bills will return to the Oklahoma House of Representatives for an acceptance of the Senate amendment(s) or to work out the differences in a conference committee, but can go directly to the governor after Senate passage.

The Oklahoma House is not subject to the state's open meeting and open records laws due to provisions to exempt the state legislature in the 1977-enacted laws.

Party composition

Current members

Notable past members
 Mary Fallin, 27th governor of Oklahoma, former U.S. Congresswoman
 Dan Boren, former U.S. Congressman
 Ernest Istook, former U.S. Congressman
 Jari Askins, 15th Oklahoma lieutenant governor, 1st female House minority leader
 Ken A. Miller, former Oklahoma treasurer
 Glen D. Johnson Jr., current Chancellor of Higher Education, former U.S. Congressman, former speaker of the House
 John Jarman, former U.S. Congressman
 Frank Keating, 25th governor of Oklahoma
 Henry Bellmon, 18th and 23rd governor of Oklahoma
 George Nigh, 17th and 22nd governor of Oklahoma
 David Boren, 21st governor of Oklahoma and former U.S. senator
 James C. Nance, Oklahoma community newspaper chain publisher and former Speaker of the Oklahoma House of Representatives, President pro tempore of the Oklahoma Senate and member Uniform Law Commission
 Harry J. W. Belvin, longest serving Principal Chief of the Choctaw Nation served as both an Oklahoma Senator and a 3-term Member of the Oklahoma House of Representatives 
 Leon C. Phillips, 11th governor of Oklahoma
 William H. Murray, 9th governor of Oklahoma
 John Newbold Camp, former U.S. Congressman
 Victor Wickersham, former U.S. Congressman
 A. C. Hamlin, first African-American in Oklahoma Legislature
 Todd Hiett, former speaker of the House and current corporation commissioner
 T. W. Shannon, first African-American speaker of the House
 Susan Winchester, first female speaker pro tempore of the House
 Pam Peterson, first female majority floor leader

Organization
Leadership in the state House begins two leaders elected by their fellow lawmakers - the Speaker of the Oklahoma House of Representatives and Speaker Pro Tempore. Party caucuses play a major role in this process by nominating candidates for key leadership positions.

The speaker appoints a majority floor leader and a majority whip. The majority floor leader sets the floor calendar during session. The duties of the majority whip are to assist the floor leader, ensure member attendance, count votes, and communicate the majority position on issues.

The speaker also names assistant floor leaders, assistant whips, and caucus officers. Additionally, the minority party caucus elects a minority leader. The minority leader develops caucus positions, negotiates with the majority party caucus, and directs minority caucus activities on the chamber floor.

The speaker appoints committee and subcommittee chairs and vice chairs. The majority floor leader selects an informal team that assists with management of legislation on the House Floor.

As of November 2018, The Oklahoma House of Representatives has 22 committees and 10 subcommittees.

A non-partisan staff provides professional services for members of the Oklahoma House of Representatives in addition to the Oklahoma Legislative Service Bureau. Individual members are also assisted by partisan staff members, and those in leadership positions have additional partisan staff. Committees are staffed primarily by research, fiscal and legal staff. The current Clerk of the House is Jan B. Harrison.

Membership

Terms and qualifications
In order to file for election to the Oklahoma House of Representatives, one must be 21 years of age at the time of their election and a qualified elector and resident of their legislative district. Officers of the United States or state government and individuals who have been adjudged guilty of a felony are not eligible to election to the Oklahoma Legislature. If a member of the Oklahoma Legislature is expelled for corruption, they are not eligible to return to legislative office.

State representatives serve a two-year term and are limited to six terms or 12 years. No member of the Oklahoma House of Representatives can serve more than 12 years in the Oklahoma Legislature. A term-limited member can not run for election to the Senate as both Representative terms and Senate terms are added together in determining the total number of Legislative years in office.

Salaries and benefits
Members of the Oklahoma House of Representatives receive $38,400 in annual pay. The Speaker of the Oklahoma House of Representatives receives $56,332 in annual pay. The Speaker Pro Tempore, minority leader and appropriations chair receive $50,764 in annual pay. Pay is set by a nine-member state board appointed by the governor, Speaker, and President Pro Tempore of the Oklahoma Senate.

State legislators can seek reimbursement for expenses related to meals, lodging, and travel related to their duties at any point during the year. They have access to benefits, including health and life insurance and retirement savings plans.

Current makeup
As of November 2018, members of the Republican Party hold a supermajority in the House, or three-fourths seats. There are 77 Republicans and 24 Democrats.

Representation
Originally, the House was apportioned according to a method spelled out in the state constitution, in which each county formed a legislative district.  Representation was determined by taking the total population of the state, according to the most recent federal census, and that number was divided by one hundred, with the quotient equaling one ratio. Counties having a population less than one full ratio received one Representative; every county containing an entire ratio but less than two ratios was to be assigned two Representatives; every county containing a population of two entire ratios but less than three ratios was to be assigned three Representatives; and every county containing a population of three entire ratios but less than four ratios was to be assigned four Representatives. After the first four Representatives, a county was to qualify for additional representation on the basis of two whole ratios of population for each additional Representative.

In 1964, the United States Supreme Court ruled that this method violated the federal constitution, as it resulted in districts having wildly different populations. State lawmakers implemented a new method that continues to be used today. The Oklahoma House of Representatives must draw new district boundaries within 90 days of the latest Federal Decennial Census. Under the holding of Reynolds v. Sims, 377 U.S. 533 (1964) districts must be apportioned within a five percent margin of the average target size district as determined by the U.S. Census population figures divided by the one hundred and one districts. This allows for certain districts to be slightly smaller or larger than others. The Oklahoma House of Representatives draws its own maps of its district lines, which are subject to the approval of both the state senate and the governor. Should the redistricting not occur in the time limits prescribed by law, the lines are determined by a panel of five statewide elected officials.

Leadership

Majority Leadership

Minority Leadership

Past composition of the House of Representatives

See also 
 List of United States state legislatures
 Government of Oklahoma
 Oklahoma Senate

References

External links 
Oklahoma House homepage

Oklahoma Legislature
State lower houses in the United States